Neath Port Talbot County Borough Council is the local authority for the county borough of Neath Port Talbot, one of the 22 principal areas of Wales. The council was controlled by the Labour Party from its creation in 1996 until 2022, when Plaid Cymru and a group of independent councillors agreed to share power.

History
The county borough and its council were created on 1 April 1996 under the Local Government (Wales) Act 1994. The borough covered the combined area of the two former districts of Port Talbot and Neath, as well as a smaller area from Lliw Valley (the majority of which went to Swansea). The new council also took over county-level responsibilities in the area from the abolished West Glamorgan County Council. The 1994 Act originally specified that the borough should be called "Neath and Port Talbot". The new authority was elected in 1995, but acted as a shadow authority alongside the outgoing county and district councils until the new arrangements took effect the following year. During that time, the shadow authority requested a change of name from "Neath and Port Talbot" to "Neath Port Talbot". The government confirmed the change with effect from 2 April 1996, one day after the new council came into being.

Political control
The first election to the new council was held in 1995, initially operating as a shadow authority before coming into its powers on 1 April 1996. Political control of the council since 1996 has been held by the following parties:

Leadership
The leaders of the council since 1996 have been:

Since the 2022 election, the council has been under no overall control. On 23 May 2022, it was announced that a coalition between the Plaid Cymru and Independent groups would lead the council. The Liberal Democrats and Green Party members would support the coalition via a confidence and supply agreement. Independent councillor, Steve Hunt, became the new leader of council, with Plaid Cymru councillor, Alun Llewelyn, as the new Deputy Leader. The new leadership was formally confirmed at the annual council meeting on 7 June 2022. The next election is due in 2027.

Current composition

Elections
Elections take place every five years, electing sixty councillors. The last election was 5 May 2022.

Party with the most elected councillors in bold. Coalition agreements in notes column.

Neath Port Talbot had been a Labour stronghold, having been in power from 1996 until 2022.

Mayoralty
On 7 June 2022, Councillor Robert Wood was appointed the mayor of Neath Port Talbot.

The deputy mayor for 2022-23 is Councillor Chris Williams.

Premises
The council's main offices are at the Civic Centre in Port Talbot, which had been built in 1987 for the former Port Talbot Borough Council. Other offices are located at the New Neath Civic Centre, and The Quays in Baglan Bay.

When created in 1996, the council also inherited the former Neath Civic Centre, which was subsequently demolished in 2008 to make way for a retail development.

Electoral wards

Following a 2021 local government boundary review, the number of electoral wards dropped from 42 to 34, with the number of elected councillors reducing from 64 to 60, effective from the 2022 local elections.

Prior to this, the county borough was divided into 42 wards, listed below, returning a total of 64 councillors. Some of these wards are coterminous with communities (parishes) of the same name. There are 19 community councils in the county borough area.  The following table lists council wards, communities and associated geographical areas. Communities with a community council are indicated with a '*':

Council Interests

The Neath Port Talbot County Borough Council administrates or jointly controls a number of business interests, which include:

Afan Forest Park
Margam Country Park

References

External links
Neath Port Talbot County Borough Council

Local authorities of Wales
Politics of Neath Port Talbot
1996 establishments in Wales